Sisterwrite was Britain's first feminist bookshop. The bookshop, which opened in 1978, was run as a collective. Sisterwrite was located at 190 Upper Street, in the Islington district of north London. The bookshop also contained a cafe, called Sisterbite.

Sisterwrite was notable for having a lesbian book section, and became a hub for the local lesbian community.

Sisterwrite closed in 1993.

References

See also 
 Silver Moon Bookshop
 Gay's the Word (bookshop)

Bookshops in London
Coffeehouses and cafés in London
Feminist bookstores
LGBT culture in London
Lesbian history
1978 establishments in the United Kingdom
1993 disestablishments in the United Kingdom